The George County School District is a public school district based in Lucedale, Mississippi (USA). The district's boundaries parallel that of George County.

Schools

High School (Grades 9-12)
George County High School

Middle School (Grades 7-8)
George County Middle School

Elementary/Intermediate Schools (Grades K-6)
Agricola Elementary School (K-6)
Benndale Elementary School (K-6)
Central Elementary School (K-6)
Rocky Creek Elementary School (K-6)
Lucedale Elementary School/LC Hatcher Elementary School (K-3)
Lucedale Intermediate School (4-6)

Demographics

2006-07 school year
There were a total of 4,263 students enrolled in the George County School District during the 2006–2007 school year. The gender makeup of the district was 48% female and 52% male. The racial makeup of the district was 10.98% African American, 87.73% White, 1.06% Hispanic, 0.19% Asian, and 0.05% Native American. 44.7% of the district's students were eligible to receive free lunch.

Previous school years

Accountability statistics

Sports
Sports offered include football, baseball, basketball, soccer, tennis, golf, track & field and cross country.

See also
List of school districts in Mississippi

References

External links
 

Education in George County, Mississippi
School districts in Mississippi